Bishops College or Bishop's College may refer to:

Bishop's College, Calcutta, est. 1820
Bishops College (Newfoundland) in St. John's, Newfoundland, Canada
Bishop's College (Sri Lanka) in Colombo, Sri Lanka
Bishop's University in Quebec, Canada est. 1843, formerly known as the University of Bishop's College
Bishop's College School in Lennoxville, Quebec, Canada est. 1836
Diocesan College (more commonly known as Bishops College) in Cape Town, South Africa
Bishops' College, Cheshunt, a former Anglican theological college
Bishop's College, Thursday Island, a former Anglican theological college in Queensland, Australia